Kesto Kumar is a Bangladeshi footballer who plays as a defender. He currently plays for Muktijoddha Sangsad KC.

References

Living people
1992 births
Bangladeshi footballers
Bangladesh international footballers
Sheikh Jamal Dhanmondi Club players
Muktijoddha Sangsad KC players
Bashundhara Kings players
Abahani Limited (Dhaka) players
Bangladesh Football Premier League players
Association football defenders
Footballers at the 2014 Asian Games
Asian Games competitors for Bangladesh
Bangladeshi Hindus